Dobromyśl  (German: Augustenhöhe) is a village in the administrative district of Gmina Golczewo, within Kamień County, West Pomeranian Voivodeship, in north-western Poland.

The village has a population of 10.

See also
 History of Pomerania

References

Villages in Kamień County